This is a list of current and former state parks in Oklahoma.

Current parks

Former state parks

References

 State Parks on TravelOK.com  Official Travel & Tourism website for the State of Oklahoma

 
Lists of state parks of the United States